Bagger is the surname of:

Ankie Bagger (born 1964), Swedish disco/pop musician and singer
Eric Bagger (born 1955), Swedish writer and principal
Hartmut Bagger (born 1938), German retired general and former Chief of Staff of the German armed forces
Hedevig Johanne Bagger (1740–1822), Danish innkeeper and postmaster
Herman Bagger (1800–1880), Norwegian newspaper editor and politician
Jonathan Bagger (born 1955), American theoretical physicist
Mianne Bagger (born 1966), Danish golfer
Richard Bagger (born 1960), American politician, former New Jersey state senator and former chief of staff of Governor Chris Christie
Ruben Bagger (born 1972), Danish former footballer
Stein Bagger (born 1967), Danish entrepreneur and businessman convicted of fraud and forgery